Culverton (also Mount Carmel) is an unincorporated community in Hancock County, Georgia, United States. It lies along State Route 16 to the east of the city of Sparta, the county seat of Hancock County. Its elevation is 554 feet (169 m). The community is part of the Milledgeville Micropolitan Statistical Area.

Culverton was named after Hardy Culver, an early resident.

See also

Central Savannah River Area

References

Unincorporated communities in Hancock County, Georgia
Unincorporated communities in Georgia (U.S. state)
Milledgeville micropolitan area, Georgia